The Most Wonderful Time of the Year, released on October 5, 2010, on Heads Up, is a Gospel music album and also their 3rd Christmas album by the American contemporary Gospel music group Take 6. The album charted in December 2010 for a single week, reaching 70.

Apart from pianist Vince Guaraldi's piece "Christmas Time Is Here" (which features pianist/singer Shelea Frazier as a guest), the rest of the album is all song a cappella.

Track listing
"It's the Most Wonderful Time of the Year"
"White Christmas
"Grinch Introduction/ The Grinch/"You're a Mean One, Mr. Grinch"
"Sleigh Ride"
"I'll Be Home for Christmas"
"It Came Upon a Midnight Clear"
"The Sugarplum Dance (Dance of the Sugarplum Fairy)"
"I Saw Three Ships"
"Jingle Bells"
"Christmas Time Is Here" (featuring Shelea Frazier)

References

2010 Christmas albums
Christmas albums by American artists
Gospel Christmas albums
Take 6 albums